A nomad is a member of a people, or species, that moves from place to place.

Nomad may also refer to:

Places 
 Nomad, Michigan, an unincorporated community
 Nomad, Papua New Guinea, a major centre of the Middle Fly District of Western Province of Papua New Guinea
 Nomad Rural LLG, in Papua New Guinea
 NoMad, Manhattan, a neighborhood in New York City
 The NoMad, a hotel/restaurant in the neighborhood

Books and magazines 
 Nomad (comics), a series of characters from the Marvel Universe
 Nomad (magazine), an American literary magazine
 Nomad (novel), a 1950 science fiction novel by George O. Smith
 Nomad: From Islam to America, a 2010 autobiographical book by Ayaan Hirsi Ali
 The Nomad, a novel in the Tribe of One series by Simon Hawke
 Alan Partridge: Nomad, a 2016 autobiography by fictional broadcaster Alan Partridge

Films and television
 Nomad (1982 film), a 1982 Hong Kong film starring Leslie Cheung
 Nomads (1986 film), an urban horror film set in Los Angeles
 Nomad (2005 film), a 2005 historical epic set in Kazakhstan
 Nomads (2010 film), a 2010 drama film
 Nomads (film series), a Canadian virtual reality documentary project
 Nomad: In the Footsteps of Bruce Chatwin, a 2019 documentary directed by Werner Herzog
 Nomad (Star Trek), the name of a robot in the Star Trek episode "The Changeling"
 Nomad the Naturalist, pseudonym of Norman Ellison, author and presenter of BBC Children's Hour radio programmes
 Nomads (TV series), a Greek reality competition television series
 The Nomads (film), a 2019 sports drama set in Philadelphia

Games 
 Sega Nomad, video game console
 Nomad, the main character in the 2007 PC videogame Crysis by Crytek
 Nomad, a hostile alien faction in Freelancer
 Nomad, or Project Nomad, a 1993 DOS game
 Nomad, a vehicle in the video game Mass Effect: Andromeda
 Nomad, the codename of the main character in Tom Clancy's Ghost Recon Wildlands
 Nomad, callsign of an operative in Call of Duty: Black Ops III
 Nomad, a Moroccan operator in Tom Clancy's Rainbow Six Siege

Music
 NOMAD, an independent association working on digital art and culture, with an emphasis on sound art
 Nomad (band), a British duo, the artist of "(I Wanna Give You) Devotion"
 Nomad (NZ band), a Kiwi pop band, best known for the song "Oh My My"
 The Nomads (Swedish band), a Swedish rock band
 The Nomads (Texas band), an American band

Albums
 Nomad (Jesse Cook album), 2003, and the title track
 Nomadic (Adriana Evans album), 2004
 Nomad (Tribal Tech album), 1990
 Nomad (Mike Tramp album), 2015
 Nomad (Chasing Safety album)
 Nomad, a 2000 album by Paul Di'Anno
 Nomad, an album by Lotus (2004)
 Nomad, an album by Adam Plack recording under the name Nomad with Robert Mirabal, Mor Thiam, and Jason Baker
 Nomad, an album by Bombino (2013)
 Nomad, an album by Sky Architect (2017)

Songs
 "Nomad", by Sepultura from Chaos A.D.
 "Nomad", by Youngblood Supercult
 "Nomad", by Buckingham-Nicks, recorded as a demo in 1974 and published in 2001, under the name Candlebright, by Stevie Nicks from Trouble in Shangri-La
 "Nomad", by Walk Off the Earth
 "The Nomad", by Iron Maiden from Brave New World
 "Nomad", by Zion.T and Gen Hoshino from Shang-Chi and the Legend of the Ten Rings: The Album

Sport 
 Anstey Nomads F.C., an amateur football (soccer) club from Leicestershire, England
 Nomads Auction Manila, a football (soccer) club based in the Philippines
 Nomads R.F.C., a rugby football club based in Hong Kong
 Nomads United, a New Zealand soccer club based in Christchurch
 Nomads Women's rugby team, an international invitational women's rugby team
 North Winnipeg Nomads Football Club, an amateur Canadian football club in Winnipeg, Manitoba

Technology 
 Monad (functional programming)
 Nomad Goods, a consumer electronics accessory company in  Santa Barbara, CA
 Nomad Health, an online marketplace for freelance clinical jobs
 Nadir and Occultation for Mars Discovery (NOMAD), an instrument on the ExoMars Trace Gas Orbiter
 Nomad rover, an unmanned vehicle designed as a test for such a vehicle to ride on other planets
 Nomad software, a computer database and inquiry language also known as NOMAD
 Creative NOMAD, a range of digital audio players designed and sold by Creative Technology
 Navy oceanographic meteorological automatic device (NOMAD), offshore weather buoy
 Wireless Nomad, an internet cooperative based in Toronto, Canada
 Nomad, software for scheduling and deployment of tasks developed by HashiCorp

Transportation

Aircraft
 CH-112 Nomad, a variant of the Hiller OH-23 Raven helicopter used by Canadian military
 Delta Sailplane Nomad, an American motorglider
 GAF Nomad, an Australian short-take-off-and-landing (STOL) aircraft produced from 1975 to 1985
 Gin Nomad, a South Korean paraglider design
 A-17 Nomad, an attack bomber produced in 1935
 PBN Nomad, a variant of the PBY Catalina flying boat
 Stanley Nomad, a glider
 Napier Nomad, aircraft engine

Motor vehicles 
 Chevrolet Nomad, a station wagon produced by the Chevrolet Motor Division of the General Motors Corporation from 1955 to 1961
 Suzuki Escudo Nomad, a sport utility vehicle
 Nomads (motorcycle club), an outlaw motorcycle club in Australia
 Nomad (motorcycle club membership), a member of a motorcycle club

Ships
 SS Nomadic (1911), a ship of the White Star line and tender for the RMS Titanic
 , a United States Navy patrol boat in commission from 1917 to 1918
 , a British Royal Navy destroyer launched in February 1916 and sunk in May 1916

Other uses
 Nomad (company), a Japanese animation company
 Nominated adviser of the London Stock Exchange Alternative Investment Market
 Nomad (Dragonfly), a species of dragonfly